Brown and Roach Incorporated is an album by American jazz trumpeter Clifford Brown and drummer Max Roach featuring tracks recorded in August 1954 and released on the EmArcy label.

Reception

Allmusic awarded the album 4 stars calling it "Near-classic music from a legendary group".

Track listing
 "Sweet Clifford" (Clifford Brown) - 6:41    
 "I Don't Stand a Ghost of a Chance with You" (Bing Crosby, Ned Washington, Victor Young) - 7:19    
 "Stompin' at the Savoy" (Benny Goodman, Andy Razaf, Edgar Sampson, Chick Webb) - 6:23    
 "I'll String Along with You" (Al Dubin, Harry Warren) - 4:09    
 "Mildama" (Max Roach) - 4:30    
 "Darn That Dream" (Eddie DeLange, Jimmy Van Heusen) - 4:02    
 "I Get a Kick out of You" (Cole Porter) - 7:36

Recorded at Capitol Studios in Los Angeles, California on August 2 (track 6), August 3 (tracks 1 & 2), August 5 (tracks 3, 4 & 7) and August 6 (track 5), 1954

Personnel 
Clifford Brown - trumpet (tracks 1-3 & 5, 7)
Max Roach - drums
Harold Land - tenor saxophone (tracks 1, 3 & 5-7)
Richie Powell - piano
George Morrow - bass

References 

1955 albums
Max Roach albums
Clifford Brown albums
EmArcy Records albums